Anaru-ye Yaieh (also romanized as Anārū-ye Yaīeh; also known as Anārū) is a village in Amjaz Rural District, in the Central District of Anbarabad County, Kerman Province, Iran. At the 2006 census, its population was 23, in 6 families.

References 

Populated places in Anbarabad County